The Toy Museum is a museum of toys and games in Brussels, Belgium. The museum opened on 14 November 1990.  The core collection was amassed by a family of amateur toy enthusiasts and has grown through donations by the public as well as purchases.

The museum is home to over 25,000 historic toys and games, mostly from the 1950s to the 1980s, with the oldest dating back to 1830.

The Toy Museum is located at 24, /, 1000 Brussels.

References

External links
 Official site

Toy museums
Museums in Brussels
Museums established in 1990
1990 establishments in Belgium